Isadora Cerullo (born 24 March 1991) is a Brazilian-American rugby sevens player.

Early life and education
Cerullo was raised in Raleigh, North Carolina. Her parents immigrated to the United States from Brazil  in the last years of the country's military dictatorship which lasted from 1964 to 1985. She is one of four children and a triplet, with two brothers the same age and one older brother. She is a dual citizen of the United States and Brazil. Cerullo graduated in 2009 from William G. Enloe High School, where she was a member of the varsity soccer and cross-country teams. She went on to attend Columbia University to study medicine and was a member of the rugby team and a writer for the Columbia Daily Spectator, graduating in 2013. While a student at Columbia, she worked as an emergency medical technician.

Career
Cerullo was recruited to play internationally while a member of Philadelphia Women's Rugby Football Club. Cerullo moved to São Paulo to play rugby professionally. She won a bronze medal at the 2015 Pan American Games as a member of the Brazil women's national rugby sevens team. She was selected for the  Brazil women's rugby sevens team to compete in the 2016 Summer Olympics in Rio de Janeiro. Brazil's women's rugby team placed ninth at the 2016 Olympics.

Personal life
Following the final of the women's rugby sevens at the 2016 Summer Olympics Cerullo's partner of two years, Marjorie Yuri Enya, walked onto the field at Deodoro Stadium and publicly asked Cerullo to marry her. The proposal was widely reported in the media, with Cerullo being the first athlete to accept a marriage proposal at the Olympics. The couple currently lives in São Paulo. Cerullo is a feminist.

References

External links
 
 
 
 
 

1991 births
Living people
American feminists
American sportspeople of Brazilian descent
Brazilian feminists
Brazil international rugby sevens players
Columbia University Vagelos College of Physicians and Surgeons alumni
Female rugby sevens players
LGBT people from North Carolina
Brazilian LGBT sportspeople
American LGBT sportspeople
LGBT rugby union players
LGBT Hispanic and Latino American people
Olympic rugby sevens players of Brazil
Pan American Games bronze medalists for Brazil
Pan American Games medalists in rugby sevens
Rugby sevens players at the 2016 Summer Olympics
Rugby sevens players at the 2015 Pan American Games
South American Games gold medalists for Brazil
South American Games medalists in rugby sevens
Sportspeople from Raleigh, North Carolina
Triplets
William G. Enloe High School alumni
Competitors at the 2018 South American Games
Rugby sevens players at the 2019 Pan American Games
Columbia College (New York) alumni
Medalists at the 2015 Pan American Games
Rugby sevens players at the 2020 Summer Olympics
Brazilian female rugby union players
Brazil international women's rugby sevens players
Brazilian rugby sevens players